This was the first edition of the tournament as a 125K event. Petra Mandula and Patricia Wartusch were the champions when it was last held as a Tier III event in 2003, but both have since retired from the sport.

Xenia Knoll and Petra Martić won the title, defeating Raluca Olaru and İpek Soylu in the final, 6–3, 6–2.

Seeds
All seeds received a bye into the quarterfinals.

Draw

External links
 Main Draw

Bol Open - Women's Doubles
Croatian Bol Ladies Open